The mantle zone (or just mantle) of a lymphatic nodule (or lymphatic follicle) is an outer ring of small lymphocytes surrounding a germinal center.

It is also known as the "corona".

It contains transient lymphocytes.

It is the location of the lymphoma in mantle cell lymphoma.

Pathology

Mantle zone expansion may be seen in benign, such as Castleman disease, and malignancy, i.e., Mantle cell lymphoma.  Tcl-1 is expressed in the mantle zone.

References

External links
 https://web.archive.org/web/20080813003821/http://erl.pathology.iupui.edu/HISTO/LABE109.HTM
  — "Lymphoid Tissues and Organs: lymph node, cortex and medulla"

Lymphatic organ anatomy